This lists ranks the tallest buildings in the Czech Republic that stand at least  tall. For non-building structures, see List of tallest structures in the Czech Republic

Tallest Buildings

Church and Town Towers

See also 
 List of tallest buildings in Prague

References 

Czech Republic

Czech Republic
Tallest buildings